I.M. Skaugen or IMS is a shipping company that operates within petrochemical gases and liquefied petroleum gas (LPG) and lightering of crude oil and liquefied natural gas (LNG). IMS is horizontal integrated and designs, builds, owns and operates its fleet of vessels. The company also owns Norgas and Skaugen PetroTrans.

History
The company dates back to 1916 when Isak Martinius Skaugen founded D/S-A/S Eikland. After World War II Skaugen and Sven Salén founded the joint venture Salen-Skaugen Line that offered passenger and cargo liner service from the United States East Coast to the Middle East. In the 1960s Skaugen entered the Norwegian Bulk Carrier Pool and during the 1970s the company co-founded Royal Caribbean Cruise Line. 1982 saw the founding of Norwegian Gas Carriers along with four other shipping companies. In 1988 the company sold its partial ownership in Royal Caribbean Cruise Line and bought the conglomerate Kosmos. Two years later the company was listed on the Oslo Stock Exchange when it merged with Laboremus and Kosmos Shipping. The Kosmos shuttle tanker operation was at the same time spun off in Skaugen PetroTrans.

Shipping companies of Norway
Tanker shipping companies
Gas shipping companies
Transport companies established in 1916
1916 establishments in Norway
Companies listed on the Oslo Stock Exchange

Bankruptcy 
At the end of 2018, I.M. Skaugen went into bankruptcy. Skaugen had lost an important partner and had to look for additional financing, but after months of negotiation refinancing failed. The shipping company had no other choice than to file for bankruptcy.